In cricket, a five-wicket haul – also known as a five-for or fifer – refers to a bowler taking five or more wickets in a single innings. This is regarded as a notable achievement. This list is a compilation of total five-wicket hauls taken by international cricketers, split between different formats and presents a good view to compare performance of bowlers in all 3 formats of the game that are played at an international level.

Test cricket is the longest form of the sport of cricket and is considered its highest standard for both batsmen and bowlers. Today, Test matches are scheduled to be played across five consecutive days. Bowlers have no limit on the number of overs that they can bowl. Also, since each team can potentially play two innings, bowlers of each team get the opportunity to bowl at the opposition twice. The first officially recognised Test match took place on 15–19 March 1877 and was played between England and Australia at the Melbourne Cricket Ground (MCG).

One Day International (ODI) cricket is a form of limited overs cricket, played between two teams with international status, in which each team faces a fixed number of overs, usually 50. Bowlers are allowed a maximum of 10 overs in ODI cricket. The first ODI was played on 5 January 1971 between Australia and England at the MCG. Twenty20 International (T20I) cricket is a form of limited overs cricket, played between two of the international members of the International Cricket Council (ICC), in which each team faces twenty overs. Bowlers are allowed a maximum of 4 overs in T20I cricket. The first Twenty20 International match between two men's sides was played on 17 February 2005, involving Australia and New Zealand.

In December 2018 in the 2nd T20I against West Indies, Shakib became the eighth cricketer to take at least one five wicket-haul in all three formats who is currently at 24th position in this list.

Key

Men's cricket 

Players from all teams that are full members of the International Cricket Council (ICC), except Ireland, have five-wicket hauls in a Test.

The first player to record a five-wicket haul in a Test innings was Australian Billy Midwinter in the second innings of the first Test cricket match ever played. The opponents were England. In the same match, two other players - Alfred Shaw of England and Australian Tom Kendall also recorded five-wicket hauls. Nasim-ul-Ghani is the youngest player to record five-wicket haul, at 16 years and 303 days. Bert Ironmonger is the oldest player to record five-wicket haul, capturing two five-wicket hauls in a match at 49 years and 311 days. three cricketers - Jim Laker, Anil Kumble and Ajaz Patel hold the distinction of taking all 10 wickets in the innings. In the same match where Jim Laker took all wickets in the innings, he captured 19 wickets in the match, the most wickets ever captured by a bowler in a Test match. By December 2018, 150 cricketers had taken five-wicket hauls on Test debut five-wicket haul on debut in a Test match. Of these, nine cricketers have taken two five-wicket hauls on their Test debut, including four from England, two from Australia and one each from India, South Africa and the West Indies.

Dennis Lillee recorded the first five-wicket haul in ODI cricket, taking 5 wickets for 34 runs in 12 overs against Pakistan at Headingley in 1975. Chaminda Vaas has the best haul in ODIs, taking 8 wickets for 19 runs against Zimbabwe in 2001 in Colombo. Mujeeb Ur Rahman (16 years 325 days) and Sunil Dhaniram (39 years and 256 days) are the current record holders for youngest and oldest cricketers to record a five-wicket haul in ODI cricket. By December 2018, 13 five-wicket hauls have been taken by players on their ODI debut.

Umar Gul recorded the first five-wicket haul in T20Is, taking 5 wickets for 6 runs in 3 overs against New Zealand at The Oval in 2009. Deepak Chahar has the best haul in T20I taking 6 wickets for 7 runs against Bangladesh at Nagpur in 2019. Rashid Khan (18 years 171 days) and Imran Tahir (37 years 327 days) are the current record holders for youngest and oldest cricketers to record a five-wicket haul in T20I cricket.

Muthiah Muralitharan has the highest number of five-wicket hauls, with 77 across Test and ODI cricket. His haul of 67 five-wicket hauls is the highest in Test cricket. With 13 five-wicket hauls, Waqar Younis holds the highest number of five-wicket hauls in ODI cricket. 10 players - Umar Gul, Ajantha Mendis, Lasith Malinga, Tim Southee, Imran Tahir, Kuldeep Yadav, Bhuvneshwar Kumar, Shakib Al Hasan, Rashid Khan and Jason Holder have taken at least one five-wicket haul in every format. Ajantha Mendis and Umar Gul are the only cricketers with multiple five-wicket hauls in all formats of the game. They also have the joint distinction of the most T20I five-wicket hauls.

To date, 51 cricketers have taken 15 or more five-wicket hauls and 26 of whom went on to take 20 or more five-wicket hauls. Nine players have taken 30 or more five-wicket hauls in their international career across the three formats.

Last updated: 19 March 2023

Women's cricket 
The first player to record a five-wicket haul in a Test innings was England's Myrtle Maclagan in the first innings of the first Test match ever played. The opponents were Australia. In the same match, two other players - Australian Anne Palmer and England's Mary Spear also recorded five-wicket hauls. India's Neetu David holds the distinction of taking the highest number of wickets in Test innings - 8 wickets against England at Jamshedpur in 1995. In the same match where Jim Laker captured all wickets in the innings, he captured 19 wickets in the match, the most wickets ever captured by a bowler in a Test match. As of December 2018, 13 cricketers have taken five-wicket hauls on Test debut five-wicket haul on debut in a Test match.

Tina Macpherson and Glenys Page recorded the first five-wicket haul in Women's One Day International cricket (WODI) taking 5/14 and 6/20 against Young England and Trinidad and Tobago on 23 June 1973 - the first day of the inaugural Women's Cricket World Cup. Sajjida Shah has the best haul in WODI cricket, taking 7 wickets for 4 runs against Japan in 2003 in Amsterdam. Macpherson and Page are two of only five players to take a five-wicket haul during their WODI debut, the others being India's Purnima Choudhary, Laura Harper of England and Felicity Leydon-Davis from New Zealand.

The first five-wicket haul in a Women's Twenty20 International (WT20I) match was taken by New Zealand's Amy Satterthwaite against England on 16 August 2007. Satterthwaite took six wickets for 17 runs, the first six-wicket haul in the international format. The best bowling figures in an innings was taken by Botswana's's Botsogo Mpedi who returned figures of 6 for 8 against Lesotho during the Botswana 7s tournament in Gaborone in August 2018. Mpedi is also the only bowler to take a five-wicket haul on WT20I debut.

, Anisa Mohammed has the most five-wicket hauls in Women's cricket. Her 8 five-wicket hauls have come in WODI and WT20I cricket and she has not played Test cricket. Shubhangi Kulkarni and Mary Duggan have the joint highest five-wicket hauls in Test cricket, with 5 five-wicket hauls. Betty Wilson is the only woman cricketer with multiple 10 wicket hauls in a match.

As of January 2019, 13 women cricketers have taken 4 or more five-wicket hauls across all formats.

Last updated: 17 January 2019

See also 

 List of cricketers who have taken five-wicket hauls on Test debut
 List of cricketers who have taken five-wicket hauls on One Day International debut
 List of cricketers who have taken five-wicket hauls on Women Test debut

Notes

References 

Lists of international cricket five-wicket hauls
Cricket records and statistics
Five-wicket hauls